is a former Japanese football player.

Playing career
Nishikawa was born in Sakura on April 10, 1978. After graduating from Chuo University, he joined J2 League club Oita Trinita in 2001. On June 13, he debuted against Júbilo Iwata in 2001 J.League Cup. However he could hardly play in the match in 2001. In 2002, he moved to J2 club Shonan Bellmare. Although he played many matches in early 2003 season, he could not play many matches in 2 seasons. In 2004, he moved to Japan Football League (JFL) club Sagawa Printing. He played many matches in 2004. During the 2005 season, he moved to his local club Tochigi SC in JFL. He played many matches until 2006. However his opportunity to play decreased in 2007 and he retired end of 2007 season.

Club statistics

References

External links

1978 births
Living people
Chuo University alumni
Association football people from Tochigi Prefecture
Japanese footballers
J2 League players
Japan Football League players
Oita Trinita players
Shonan Bellmare players
SP Kyoto FC players
Tochigi SC players
Association football midfielders